The 2018 United States House of Representatives election in Alaska were held on November 6, 2018, to elect the U.S. representative from Alaska's at-large congressional district, who will represent the state of Alaska in the 116th United States Congress. The election coincided with other elections to the House of Representatives, as well as elections to the United States Senate and various state and local elections.

Republican primary

Candidates

Declared
Thomas "John" Nelson, businessman
Jed Whittaker
Don Young, incumbent U.S. Representative and Dean of the House of Representatives

Results

Democratic–Libertarian–Independence primary
Candidates from the Alaska Democratic Party, Alaska Libertarian Party and Alaskan Independence Party appear on the same ballot, with the highest-placed candidate from each party receiving that party's nomination.

Candidates

Declared
Christopher C. Cumings, running as Non-partisan (N)
Alyse S. Galvin, running as Undeclared (U)
Carol "Kitty" Hafner, running as Democrat (D)
Dimitri Shein, running as Democrat (D)

Endorsements

Results

General election

Predictions

Endorsements

Polling

Results

Notes

References

External links
Candidates at Vote Smart 
Candidates at Ballotpedia 
Campaign finance at FEC 
Campaign finance at OpenSecrets

Official campaign websites
Alyse Galvin (I) for Congress
Don Young (R) for Congress

United States House of Representatives
Alaska
2018